Calystegia longipes is a species of morning glory known by the common name Paiute false bindweed.

It is native to the southwestern United States from California to Utah, where it grows in many types of habitat.

Description
It is a woody perennial herb growing into a bushy form up to a meter tall, with many spreading and erect, twining branches. The small leaves are linear to narrowly lance-shaped and sometimes have small lobes divided from the sides. The inflorescence is a solitary flower on a long peduncle up to 20 centimeters in length. The morning glory flower at the end is a white to pale lavender or pinkish bloom 2 or 3 centimeters wide.

References

External links
Jepson Manual Treatment
Photo gallery

longipes
Flora of California
Flora of Nevada
Flora of Utah
Flora of Arizona
Flora of the Sierra Nevada (United States)
Natural history of the California Coast Ranges
Flora of the California desert regions
Flora of the Great Basin
Flora of the Sonoran Deserts
Flora of North America